Arosha Perera (born 10 September 1980) is a Sri Lankan cricketer. He played 36 first-class and 19 List A matches for multiple domestic sides in Sri Lanka between 2001 and 2005. His last first-class match was for Western Province cricket team in the 2004–05 Premier Trophy on 23 February 2005. He made his Twenty20 debut on 17 August 2004, for Chilaw Marians Cricket Club in the 2004 SLC Twenty20 Tournament.

See also
 List of Chilaw Marians Cricket Club players

References

External links
 

1980 births
Living people
Sri Lankan cricketers
Chilaw Marians Cricket Club cricketers
Place of birth missing (living people)